Clepsis scaeodoxa is a species of moth of the family Tortricidae. It is found in the Democratic Republic of Congo.

References

Moths described in 1935
Clepsis
Taxa named by Edward Meyrick
Endemic fauna of the Democratic Republic of the Congo